Wayne Township, Ohio, may refer to:
Wayne Township, Adams County, Ohio
Wayne Township, Ashtabula County, Ohio
Wayne Township, Auglaize County, Ohio
Wayne Township, Belmont County, Ohio
Wayne Township, Butler County, Ohio
Wayne Township, Champaign County, Ohio
Wayne Township, Clermont County, Ohio
Wayne Township, Clinton County, Ohio
Wayne Township, Columbiana County, Ohio
Wayne Township, Darke County, Ohio
Wayne Township, Fayette County, Ohio
Wayne Township, Jefferson County, Ohio
Wayne Township, Knox County, Ohio
Wayne Township, Mercer County, Ohio (paper township, now part of Celina, Ohio)
Wayne Township, Monroe County, Ohio
Wayne Township, Montgomery County, Ohio (defunct, now Huber Heights, Ohio)
Wayne Township, Muskingum County, Ohio
Wayne Township, Noble County, Ohio
Wayne Township, Pickaway County, Ohio
Wayne Township, Tuscarawas County, Ohio
Wayne Township, Warren County, Ohio
Wayne Township, Wayne County, Ohio
Noble Township, Auglaize County, Ohio, named Wayne Township while it remained a part of Mercer County prior to the creation of Auglaize County in 1848

Ohio township disambiguation pages